Douglas DeMuro (born May 22, 1988) is an American YouTuber, author, columnist, writer, and Internet entrepreneur who currently lives in San Diego, California. DeMuro's focus is on the automotive industry; his car review-focused YouTube channel has over 4.6 million subscribers as of 2023.

In addition to his YouTube endeavors, DeMuro also runs the automobile selling website Cars & Bids, which allows individuals to purchase and sell vehicles in online auctions. He launched the business in 2020 after leaving his previous position as a writer and editor of Autotrader.com car blog Oversteer.

Previously, DeMuro wrote articles for The Truth About Cars and Jalopnik.

Early life and education
DeMuro was born and raised in Denver, Colorado, where he attended George Washington High School. In 2009, DeMuro was featured in Automobile for his hobby of car spotting. He then went on to study at Emory University in Atlanta, Georgia, obtaining a bachelor's degree in economics, and met his wife while he was working as a resident advisor there.

Career

Early writing for car blogs 
DeMuro's first job was at Porsche's North American headquarters in Atlanta as a "vehicle allocation manager". In addition to this, he wrote articles on Autotrader.com. In 2013, after one year at Porsche, DeMuro quit his job in order to focus on automotive writing. He wrote articles for three different car blogs: The Truth About Cars between January and September, his own blog called PlaysWithCars throughout 2013, and Jalopnik starting in April. Furthermore, he wrote two books that were published in July 2013, namely Plays With Cars containing personal car stories and the e-book From My Perspective about DeMuro's perspective on things unrelated to cars.

While working for Jalopnik, DeMuro wrote columns, answered letters from readers, shot videos for his YouTube channel, and occasionally reviewed cars. Furthermore, he bought interesting second-hand cars recommended by readers, which he then reviewed and wrote columns about. Among those cars was a 2004 Ferrari 360 Modena DeMuro purchased in January 2014 with a loan. He kept the car for one year.

In the summer of 2014, DeMuro moved from Atlanta to Philadelphia, Pennsylvania. DeMuro started writing again for The Truth About Cars the next year, while still working for Jalopnik. At the recommendation of readers, DeMuro bought a 2007 Aston Martin V8 Vantage in January 2016 with a "bumper-to-bumper" warranty, of which he documented his ownership. Later that year, DeMuro's new book Bumper to Bumper was released. Some of his columns and reviews were published by the Philadelphia Media Network in 2014 and by The Atlanta Journal-Constitution in 2015.

Oversteer and YouTube 
In the summer of 2016, DeMuro moved to the newly created Autotrader.com car blog Oversteer, of which he became the editor. He kept writing articles and columns, but started focusing more on filming and writing car reviews on YouTube. DeMuro has reviewed a wide array of cars on his channel, mainly from the 1970s to the present. Those cars include supercars like the Ford GT, the Bugatti Chiron, and the Ferrari F40; but also new, innovative, and quirky cars including the Tesla Model 3, the Maserati Ghibli, and the BMW Isetta.

In a typical review, DeMuro first addresses exterior and interior "quirks and features", then drives the car, and concludes with giving the car a score between 10 and 100. That score, which he calls a "DougScore", is based on the scores in ten separate categories related to usability and fun. Most of the cars DeMuro reviews are not press cars, but are owned by dealerships and individuals. The first car to receive the DougScore was the CarMax Range Rover.

His YouTube channel has amassed just over four million subscribers, as of April 2021. DeMuro also started a second channel called More Doug DeMuro in August 2018, which has nearly 750,000 subscribers as of March 2021. It features more opinion-based and vlog-style content, as well as question and answer videos.

DeMuro appeared in the Jay Leno's Garage season three episode "Larger Than Life", in which he tried to recognize cars while being blindfolded, in June 2017. He worked with Leno again in March 2019, when he reviewed his McLaren F1.

Cars & Bids 
DeMuro left Autotrader.com to focus on a new venture which eventually grew into the car auction website Cars & Bids, which he had first conceived in 2019. The website, a competitor of "Bring a Trailer", is aimed at cars for enthusiasts and only accepts cars built in 1981 or later. The first car listed on the site was DeMuro's own 2012 Mercedes-Benz E 63 AMG Wagon. The company reported 4,000 listed cars and US $75 million spent by purchasers during 2021.

In February 2023, The Chernin Group acquired a majority stake in Cars & Bids for million.

Personal life
DeMuro lives in San Diego, California, with his wife, Joanna, a bearded Collie named Noodle, who has made several appearances in his videos since DeMuro adopted him, and one child, a boy, born on September 2, 2021.

Bibliography

References

External links
 Personal website
 Doug DeMuro's channel on YouTube
 Cars & Bids - Auction site launched by DeMuro

1988 births
21st-century American male writers
American male bloggers
American bloggers
American YouTubers
Emory University alumni
Living people
People from Denver
People from Philadelphia
People from San Diego